Salma Solaun (born March 2 2005) is a Spanish rhythmic gymnast who competed at the 2019 Junior World Rhythmic Gymnastic championships, where she won a bronze medal. She also won a silver medal at the 2022 European Rhythmic Gymnastics Championships, in the 3 ribbons + 2 balls final.

Personal life 
Solaun took up gymnastics at age three because she was restless, so her parents signed her up for a rhythmic gymnastics class. She also tried swimming and skating, but in the end she chose rhythmic gymnastics. Salma now says that "rhythmic gymnastics is part of my life. I could not see myself without it". Her dream is to compete at the Olympic Games, like her idols Almudena Cid and Ganna Rizatdinova.

Career

Junior 
In 2018 Solaun was integrated in the national team while competing for Beti Aurrera. She then started taking part in international tournaments representing Spain. In June 2019, after winning the junior Spanish championships, Salma was selected for the Junior World Championships in Moscow, Russia, where she made the ribbon final in the end winning an historical bronze, the first individual medal for Spain since 1993.

Senior 
In 2020 Solaun was included in the senior national team, she won medals in competitions, such as the Moscow Grand Prix in February. In 2021 she was among the contenders to represent Spain at the 2021 World Championship, she made the team but an injury to her left knee prevented her from competing and was replaced by her teammate Teresa Gorospe. She underwent surgery on the problem in November 2021 and was away from the sport for five months. In 2022 Solaun decided to switch to the group making her debut in 2022 at the World Cup in Sofia, they were 5th in the All-Around and 5 hoops and 6th with 3 ribbons + 2 balls.
 In Baku they were 12th in the All-Around and therefore didn't qualify for event finals. A month later in Pamplona they won bronze in the All-Around and silver with 5 hoops. In Portimão they won 3 silver medals. They won All-Around bronze and 5 hoops and silver with 3 ribbons + 2 balls in Cluj-Napoca. Salma took part, with Ana Arnau, Inés Bergua, Valeria Márquez, Mireia Martínez and Patricia Pérez in the 2022 European Championships in Tel Aviv, winning silver in the 3 ribbons + 2 balls final, and the World Championshipsin Sofia where the Spanish group won three bronze medals: All-Around (earning them a spot for the 2024 Olympics), 5 hoops, and team.

References 

2005 births
Living people
Spanish rhythmic gymnasts
Medalists at the Junior World Rhythmic Gymnastics Championships
Medalists at the Rhythmic Gymnastics World Championships
Medalists at the Rhythmic Gymnastics European Championships
21st-century Spanish women